CRRC Tangshan unveiled the prototype high-speed freight electric multiple unit in December 2020, with top speeds of 350 km/hour.

Design 
The  prototype builds on a temporarily rebuilt CR400BF passenger trainset (used for Alibaba's Single's Day shopping festival in November 2020), with purpose-built 2.9m doors, accommodating two rows of containers with roller floors.

The train was designed using biomimicry to resemble a Chinese sturgeon, which reduces air resistance.

References 

High-speed rail in China
High-speed trains of China
Electric multiple units of China